The Goodtime III is the third generation of sightseeing boats that cruise and tour Lake Erie and the Cuyahoga River. The boat can hold 1,000 passengers, has four decks and indoor and outdoor seating. Tours of the Cleveland area waterways are narrated and include local and natural history. The boats and the cruise tours have been owned and operated by the Fryan family since 1958.

About 
Goodtime III is the largest excursion boat in Cleveland, Ohio and is able to hold up to 1,000 passengers. The four-deck boat is equipped with 3 bars and 2 dance floors. Its dimensions are 151-by-40 feet. The boat provides sightseeing tours of the Cuyahoga River and Lake Erie that include both local and natural history of the region. There is both indoor and outdoor seating and a dining area. The Goodtime III averages about 300 tours a year.

History 
The Goodtime III is part of a series of boats named Goodtime, Goodtime I and Goodtime II. The first Goodtime tour took place on the Goodtime I in 1958 when brothers, Vince and Herb Fryan started taking the 150-passenger boat out for tours on Lake Erie and the Cuyahoga River. The Fryan brothers sold the Goodtime I in 1965, keeping only the larger Goodtime II. The Goodtime II could hold up to 475 guests. Goodtime II was renamed Liberty Bell II and the first Goodtime was still operating in Sandusky, Ohio in the 1990s. These boats were in turn named after another Goodtime that carried passengers on Lake Erie and was run by the Cleveland and Buffalo Transit Company between 1924 and 1938. This passenger boat was originally named the City of Detroit II and had been built in 1889.

The Fryan brothers sold the business to Vince's son, Jim Fryan in 1984. Rick Fryan, grandson of Vince, currently runs the Goodtime III. He started working as a deckhand and salesman for the company in 1986. Jim Fryan decided to build Goodtime III in 1988. Goodtime III arrived in Cleveland in September 1990 and was anchored at the Ninth Street Pier. It started public cruises in 1991.

During the 1980s and 1990s, the boat was captained by Bruce Hudec, who started working on the ship as a deckhand in 1971. In 2013, Hudec started training Jordan Kit to work as a captain. Kit became the youngest captain to sail the Goodtime III.

References

External links 

1990 establishments in Ohio
Individual watercraft
Tourist attractions in Cleveland